Baliracq-Maumusson is a commune of the Pyrénées-Atlantiques department in the Nouvelle-Aquitaine region of south-western France.

The inhabitants of the commune are known as Baliracois or Baliracoises.

Geography
Baliracq-Maumusson is located some 45 km east by north-east of Orthez and 20 km south of Aire-sur-l'Adour. Access to the commune is by the D211 road from Lannecaube in the south which passes through the length of the commune along the eastern side to join the D41 just north of the commune. Access to the village of Baliracq is by Le Moulin road branching from the D211. The commune is mixed forest and farmland.

The Lées river forms the eastern border of the commune as it flows north to join the Adour near Aire-sur-l'Adour. The Gabassot forms the northern border of the commune as it flows east into the Lées. Two other streams rise in the commune and flow into the Lées.

Places and hamlets

 Arnathau
 Baliracq
 Bitaillou
 Bouquehort
 Bourdé
 Campagne
 Castéra
 Crédey
 Florence
 Gayas
 Hau
 Hilletou
 La Hount
 Lafon
 Lanne
 Laroujat
 Lescribau
 Maufinet
 Maumusson
 Miqueu
 Mombet
 Moncade
 Mounicou
 Mourette
 Naba
 Pédeuboscq
 Pédélatour
 Pillou
 Pourrio
 Sansot
 Tardan

Neighbouring communes and villages

Toponymy
According to Michel Grosclaude the name Baliracq probably came from a Latin man's name Valerus with the Gallo-Roman suffix -acum giving the "Domain of Valerus". For Maumusson he proposed a Gascon man's name: the nickname mau meaning "bad" combined with mus meaning "nose" and the suffix -on giving "unfriendly" or "sullen".

The following table details the origins of the commune name and other names in the commune.

Sources:
Raymond: Topographic Dictionary of the Department of Basses-Pyrenees, 1863, on the page numbers indicated in the table. 
Grosclaude: Toponymic Dictionary of communes, Béarn, 2006 
Cassini: Cassini Map from 1750
Ldh/EHESS/Cassini: 

Origins:
Marca: Pierre de Marca, History of Béarn.
Carresse: 
Terrier: Terrier of Baliracq, E 177
Reformation: Reformation of Béarn

History
Paul Raymond noted on page 20 of his 1863 dictionary that Baliracq was a vassal of the Viscounts of Béarn.

The communes of Baliracq and Maumusson were merged in 1828.

Administration
List of Successive Mayors

Mayors from 1933

Inter-communality
The commune is part of six inter-communal structures:
 the Communauté de communes des Luys en Béarn;
 the SIVU for roads in the Garlin region;
 the SIVU for the Lées and its tributaries;
 the Energy association of Pyrénées-Atlantiques;
 the inter-communal association for the supply of drinking water for Luy-Gabas-Lées;
 the inter-communal association of Five Rivers;

Demography
In 2017 the commune had 122 inhabitants.

Culture and heritage

Civil heritage
The commune has a number of buildings and structures that are registered as historical monuments:
A Mill at Baliracq (1764)
A Farmhouse at Baliracq-Bouquehort (19th century)
The Coussié House at Maumusson-Tardan (1742)
The Castéra House at Baliracq-Castéra (1742)
The Lafon House at Maumusson-Crédey (17th century)
The Sansot House at Maumusson-Sansot (19th century)
The Chateau de Milly at Maumusson-Florence (18th century)
Houses and Farms (18th-19th century)
A Fortified Area (Middle Ages)
A Fortified Complex (Prehistoric). At a place called Castera the topography has been visibly altered by the hand of man as evidenced by the presence of an ancient fortified complex with major embankments and a circular walkway which is still visible. This could be for high wooden stakes joined together because no stone remains have been found. The works could therefore date to the high Middle Ages although there could be prehistoric remains.

Religious heritage

The Parish Church of Saint Peter (11th century) is registered as an historical monument. The Church contains many items that are registered as historical objects:

An Altar, Tabernacle, and Statue (19th century)
2 Statues: Saints Felix and Peter (18th century)
A Tabernacle (17th century)
An Altar Painting: Remission of the keys to Saint Peter (19th century)
An Altar and Retable (1844)
Wood Panelling (1844)
A Wayside Cross (19th century)
An Altar Vase (20th century)
A Monstrance (18th century)
An Altar Candlestick (19th century)
6 Altar Candlesticks (18th century)
A Thurible
A Celebrant's Chair (18th century)
A Stoup (1822)
A Pulpit (18th century)
A Confessional (18th century)
The Choir Enclosure (1840)

See also
Communes of the Pyrénées-Atlantiques department

References

External links
Baliracq-Maumusson on Géoportail, National Geographic Institute (IGN) website 
Baliracq and Maumußon'' on the 1750 Cassini Map

Communes of Pyrénées-Atlantiques